Gating may refer to:

Neurobiology
Gating (electrophysiology), the opening (activation) or closing (deactivation) of ion channels 
Sensory gating, an automatic process by which the brain adjusts  to stimuli
Synaptic gating,  neural circuits suppressing inputs through synapses

Technology
Gating (telecommunication), a process of selectively modifying signals
Gating system metalwork, a process in casting
Gating signal, a signal that provides a time window 
Clock gating, a power-saving techniques used in synchronous circuits
Power gating, a power-saving technique for circuits 
Noise gate, a term in audio signal processing
Frequency-resolved optical gating, a term related to auto correlation in optics

Other
Gating (punishment),  a form of punishment used in educational establishments

See also

Gate (disambiguation)
Gates (disambiguation)